Kobalt may refer to:
 Kobalt (DC Comics), a comic book superhero
 Kobalt (tools), a brand of tools
 Kobalt Music Group, a music publishing company
 OTs-01 Kobalt, a Russian revolver

See also 
 Cobalt (disambiguation)